Sergio Castellitto (born 18 August 1953) is an Italian actor, film director, and screenwriter.

Biography
Sergio Castellitto was born in Rome in 1953, to parents from Molise and Abruzzo, Southern Italy. After graduating from the Silvio D'Amico National Academy of Dramatic Art in 1978, he began his theatrical career in Italian public theater with Shakespeare's Measure for Measure at the Teatro di Roma and with roles in other plays such as La Madre by Brecht, Merchant of Venice, and Candelaio by Giordano Bruno. At the Teatro di Genova he starred in the roles of Tuzenbach in Chekhov's Three Sisters and Jean in Strindberg's Miss Julie, both under the direction of Otomar Krejka. In the coming years, he also starred in such theatrical productions as L'infelicità senza desideri and Piccoli equivoci at the Festival dei Due Mondi in Spoleto. He also appeared in Barefoot in the Park by Neil Simon. During his years in the theatre, he worked alongside many famous actors, including Luigi Squarzina, Aldo Trionfo, and Enzo Muzii.

Castellitto began his film career in 1983 beside Marcello Mastroianni and Michel Piccoli in The General of the Dead Army by Luciano Tovoli. He interpreted many films like Sembra morto...ma è solo svenuto directed by Felice Farina, Piccoli equivoci by Ricky Tognazzi and Stasera a casa di Alice by Carlo Verdone. He became more famous with the films The Great Pumpkin by Francesca Archibugi and The Star Maker by Giuseppe Tornatore.

In the late 1980s, Castellitto appeared in several Italian television miniseries, including Un siciliano in Sicilia (1987), Cinque storie inquietanti (1987), Piazza Navona (1988), Cinéma (1988), and Come stanno bene insieme (1989). He also appeared in the miniseries Victoire, ou la douleur des femmes (2000).

Success arrived with the films La famiglia, L'ultimo bacio, Caterina in the Big City, My Mother's Smile, Mostly Martha, and especially with Don't Move, written by his wife Margaret Mazzantini. Other films that he interpreted include Il regista di matrimoni by Marco Bellocchio and La stella che non c'è by Gianni Amelio.

In France, Castellitto played the male lead opposite Jeanne Balibar in Jacques Rivette's Va savoir (2001). His most recent accomplishment as an actor has been in his role as Padre Pio: Miracle Man, arguably the defining role of his career.

The first film that he directed is Libero Burro, followed by   Don't Move. He played the role of the antagonist, King Miraz, in the film The Chronicles of Narnia: Prince Caspian.

His most recent film as director was Twice Born, which played at the Toronto Film Festival (2012),  where it was not well received by much of the English speaking press.

Most recently, Castellitto appeared in the television series In Treatment in the role of Giovanni.

Castellitto is married to Margaret Mazzantini with four children, one of these is Pietro, actor and film director himself. Castellitto also speaks fluent English and French.

Awards
 1990 David di Donatello Award for Best Supporting Actor (for Tre colonne in cronaca)
 1993 David di Donatello Award for Best Actor (for Il grande cocomero)
 1993 Golden Globe Award for Best Actor (for Il grande cocomero) 
 1995 Venice Film Festival Pasinetti Award for Best Actor (for The Star Maker)
 1996 Italian National Syndicate of Film Journalists Silver Ribbon for Best Actor (for The Star Maker)
 2000 Mons International Festival Grand Prize (for Libero Burro) 
 2002 European Film Award for Best Actor (for Mostly Martha)
 2002 Flaiano Film Festival Audience Award for Best Actor (for My Mother's Smile)
 2002 Golden Globe Award for Best Actor (for My Mother's Smile)
 2002 Italian National Syndicate of Film Journalists Silver Ribbon for Best Actor (for My Mother's Smile)
 2002 Mons International Festival Award for Best Actor (for Mostly Martha) 
 2003 Flaiano International Prize Golden Pegasus for Best Television Actor (for Ferrari) 
 2003 Sant Jordi Award for Best Foreign Actor (for Mostly Martha, Unfair Competition, and Who Knows?) 
 2004 David di Donatello Award for Best Actor (for Don't Move)
 2004 Flaiano Film Festival Audience Award for Best Film (for Don't Move) 
 2004 Golden Globe Award for Best Film (for Don't Move)
 2005 Italian National Syndicate of Film Journalists Silver Ribbon for Best Screenplay (for Don't Move)
 2006 Venice Film Festival Pasinetti Award for Best Actor (for The Missing Star) 
 2007 Italian National Syndicate of Film Journalists European Silver Ribbon (for his masterclass at Cannes)
 2009 Rome Film Fest Award for Best Actor (for Raise Your Head)
 2020 Prix Iris for Best Supporting Actor (for Mafia Inc.)

Filmography

Actor

Director

References

External links

1953 births
Italian film directors
Living people
Male actors from Rome
European Film Award for Best Actor winners
Accademia Nazionale di Arte Drammatica Silvio D'Amico alumni
David di Donatello winners
Nastro d'Argento winners
Ciak d'oro winners
People of Molisan descent
Best Supporting Actor Jutra and Iris Award winners